Royal Air Force Docking or more simply RAF Docking is a former Royal Air Force satellite station a few miles from Bircham Newton in Norfolk, England.

History

It was a satellite airfield for the RAF Coastal Command station at RAF Bircham Newton and was mostly used for overflow from there.

A grass airfield, with eight blister hangars and one A1 hangar, was laid out soon after the outbreak of war and the first squadron to operate from there was No. 235 Squadron RAF using Bristol Blenheims for convoy escort and anti-shipping operations in the North Sea. These were then replaced by the Lockheed Hudson.

A meteorological observation unit No. 405 Flight of Bomber Command was set up as part of the effort to gain important weather information.  When Coastal Command took over all the meteorological units this became No. 1401 (Met) Flight and received a greater variety of aircraft.  As well as Blenheims it operated Spitfires, Gloster Gladiator biplanes and Hawker Hurricanes. These aircraft were all used to take measurements of temperature and humidity; from 40,000 ft downwards in precise areas. In August 1942 the Flight was made into a Squadron – No. 521 – with Hudsons, Handley Page Hampdens, de Havilland Mosquitos and Lockheed Venturas. The squadron's Mosquitos would operate deep into occupied Europe to take measurements over target areas; known as "PAMPA". In 1944 the squadron moved to the other satellite for Bircham Newton, RAF Langham

Posted units

The following squadrons were here at some point:

Units

Current use

The site has reverted to farmland.

See also
List of former Royal Air Force stations

References

Citations

Bibliography

Norfolk Airfields in the Second World War Graham Smith, Countryside Books, 1997.

External links
Control Towers – RAF Docking
Airfield Archeology – RAF Docking
Bircham Newton Memorial Project

Royal Air Force stations in Norfolk
Royal Air Force stations of World War II in the United Kingdom
RAF